The following is a list of awards and nominations received by Filipino film and television actress, host and singer Bea Alonzo.

Awards and nominations

Film

Television

Other awards

FHM rankings

References

Alonzo, Bea